Shinobu Ito / 伊東忍 is a Japanese jazz and fusion guitarist. He has lived in New York City since 1977. He played mainstream jazz, but later broadened his jazz guitar style without sticking strictly to jazz.

Biography 
Ito was born in Oiso, Kanagawa, Japan.

Early Age / 1971

While a young boy, he was interested in American pop songs, so his father bought him a guitar and gave him lessons. Shinobu devoted great efforts to his study of the guitar and eventually developed an ambition to become a noted guitaristin the future. In junior high school, he organized his own pop music group and performed at various musical events. He became interested in jazz guitar during his high school days when he listened Wes Montgomery. While attending Tokai University, Shinobu studied with the respected guitar teacher, Ikuo Shiosaki, and became a member of the university's Tokai University Jazz Workshop.

Professional career in Japan / 1971-1977

He also began his professional career at this time, performing at clubs and on recordings.
In 1975, Shinobu experienced a great culture shock socially and musically during a 6-month stay in Los Angeles.

During this period in L.A. Shinobu met Toshiko Akiyoshi, who introduced him to many musicians and strongly suggested to him that he go to New York to learn and play jazz on his next visit to the States.

When he returned to Japan in 1975, Shinobu joined vocalist Yoshiko Kimura's group, and also resumed activities with top Japanese musicians such as Kohsuke Mine, Seiichi Nakamura, Shigeharu Mukai, Hidefumi Toki and Takao Uematsu. He also had opportunities to play with Tete Montliu, Bill Reichenbach, Ronnie Foster, Stanley Banks in this era.

Also in 1975, he was chosen as one of the 20 popular guitarist in Japan by Swing Journal magazine.

In keeping with his plan, Shinobu returned to the United States in 1977 and settled in New York City.

1-3. New York / 1977-2006

He became a member of a 10-piece band directed by Reggie Workman, which performed mainly at Brooklyn festivals. He also joined  Teruo Nakamura & his Rising Sun Band and became involved in various other musical activities mostly in the New York area. 
Additionally, Shinobu appeared on renowned Japanese pianist Tsuyoshi Yamamoto's album in 1981.
Some of the many musicians he played with at this time include Joe Jones Jr., Sadik Hakim, John Orr, Tommy Turrentine, Bob Mintzer, Rickey Ford and Kenny Kirkland, among others.
 
In 1982, he formed and recorded his own first fusion group with T.M.Stenens, Kyle Hicks and Gene Williams while continuing straight ahead jazz activities. He would occasionally lead groups at jazz clubs such as the Blue Note, 55 Bar, the Angry Squire, Pat's and grabbed many great opportunities to play with some great musicians including Valery Ponomarev, Lonnie Plaxico, Eddie Henderson, Lonnie Smith, Jesse Davis, Kenny  Davis and Jeff Williams, among others.
 
In 1989, Shinobu recorded with pianist Kris Defoort's 10-piece group which included Mike Formanek, Vincent Herring and Judy Niemack.

Shinobu released his first CD  in 1991 with Tom Harrell, Danny Gottlieb, Gary King, Mark Soskin and Dick Oates. 
So he did a promotional tour to Japan in 1991. Ito had made his album debut as a fusion player, and the session at legendary Roppongi Pit-Inn included old friends Ken Shima on piano, Hidefumi Toki on alto sax and Kenji Takamizu on electric bass.
 
However, what I heard on the live session recording  were not the songs I remember from my youth. Apart from "S.O.S." by Wes Montgomery, all songs were originals by Shinobu Ito, and all had very beautiful melodies.

In 1995, Shinobu subsequently joined tenor saxophonist Eric Wyatt's group and produced his debut CD in 1997.
So he has played with countless musicians who are also based mostly in Brooklyn, such as Antonio Hart, Mark Shim, Alvester Garnett, Rodney Green, Lester Bowie, Kenyatta Beasley, Tim Perryman and others.
Shinobu also performed at the Montreal Jazz Festival with renowned guitarist Ryo Kawasaki.

New Musical Direction & Beyond / 2006-present

At a same time, he took a direction not quite possible for a guitarist in jazz scene – he felt he needed to question himself on what musical direction he should be taking. 
As a guitarist, he reached out toward the musical treasure chest of Spain, and of Latin America, and listened broadly and deeply for sources of inspiration. 
Traditional music for guitar draws heavily upon tango, choro and flamenco, and Ito found inspiration in the works of Enrique Granados and Isaac Albéniz, along with contemporary Latin American composers Antonio Lauro and Manuel Ponce. 
As well, he began listening intently to the works of Heitor Villa-Lobos, who could be called the "Bach of Brazil".
These styles of music were mostly composed originally for the guitar, while even orchestral works as well as piano pieces were arranged for the guitar, all of them made up the core repertory for classical guitar. "When these types of music are played with improvisation, they organically link with jazz, which enables the creation of a new kind of music, does it not?" wonders Ito.
 
Fortunately, there are many of Latin guitarists in New York, who all exchange ideas with each other. The construction and modes of expression in these styles of playing and phrasing can be closely studied. Moreover, the beautiful melodies and active rhythms can be further brought to life within the context of the jazz groove. 
One very significant influence on Shinobu Ito has been that of Baden Powell(1937–2000), the Brazilian-born guitar genius who developed the primitive percussive style of guitar known as Afro Samba and used it for jazz improvisation.
 
It was this inspiration that led Ito to release the album to tribute to Baden Powell and Antonio Lauro  in 2002. While Ito was criticized for nylon strings on a Spanish guitar performance, it marked his decision to take a new direction.
 
While Shinobu is known as a jazz guitarist who plays with a pick, in this new direction he plays only with his fingers, as do classical guitar players. Moreover, he improvises on these tunes, effectively fusing classical guitar and jazz.
 
In a Harlem jazz club, Shinobu played blues on a full-size archtop guitar, and was said to create exactly the same groove that first-rate American blues musicians would. However, when he played hard bop, he was admired for being top level in Japan. 
However, Shinobu would not settle for that, and without sticking strictly to jazz, he sought out to broaden his sense of expression on the guitar.
 
Classical guitar genius Kazuhito Yamashita is also someone of interest to Shinobu. From this influence he got to know a guitar solo CD called Bolero, containing famous orchestral composition by Ravel, played by Larry Coryell, considered a young revolutionary for his fusion of rock and jazz in the 60s. Finding Yamashita interesting as a classical guitarist, Coryell engendered a new era, and this spirit of adventure overlapped with the bold decision taken by Shinobu to improvise on classical guitar pieces.
 
When executive jazz producer Yoichi Nakao first heard of Ito's idea to make an album of classical repertoire rendered with improvisation, he was quickly reminded of what Larry Coryell approached many years ago.
 
As a jazz guitarist who dares create a new approach, Ito has released a second Spanish guitar album that truly captures this stance of adventure. The album fully captures this feeling.
 
Shinobu Ito has worked as  an instructor in the Jazz Division of the Senzoku College of Music in Tokyo between year 2005–2007, and moves between Tokyo and New York to attend to various projects.
 
He has returned to New York City finally in March 2009 and resuming activities again.
Shinobu Ito is a mature musician who still is willing to take on a challenge and explore new directions.
 
Jazz producer Youichi Nakao quote <Shinobu Ito is probably the guitarist most worth of attention right now>.

Discography

As leader

 LIVE AT PAT'S (2019)
 LIVE AT CANDY (2013) 
 MUSICA　PARA　ENANAMORADOS (2006) 
 SERENATA (2005)
 A　TRIBUTE　TO　BARDEN　POWELL & ANTONIO　LAURO (2002)
 ONE　LIFE　TO　LIVE (2001)
 SAILING　ROLLING (1991)

As co-leader
 SERENATA (2005)

As sideman

 GOD　SON ・ Eric Wyatt (1997)
 LOOKING　AROUND ・ Kris Defoort・(1990) 
 LUCKY　YOU ・ Kris Defoort・(1990)
 P．S．I　LOVE　YOU ・ Tsuyoshi Yamamoto・(1981)

Miscellaneous work

 Billboard Song contest Awarded:Certificate of Achievement. Copyrighted with ASCAP&
 Copyright and Industrial Design Branch, CANADA・(1988)
  Jazz　Conception / Study Guide Series Japanese translation・ (1999)
 Senzoku Gakuen College of Music,Jazz Division Instructor・(2005－2007)

Musicians played with

In Japan

Tsuyoshi Yamamoto
Yoshiko Kimura
Seiichi Nakamura
Shigeharu Mukai
hidefumi Toki
Koshuke Mine
Ken Shima
Kenji Takamizu
Yoichi Togashiki
Masae Nambu
Yoshio suzuki
Tete Montliu
Dennis Davis
Ronnie Foster
Stanley Banks

Mainly in the States

Teruo Nakamura
Phillip Woo
Ryo Kawasaki
Bob Mintzer
Kris Defoort
Gene Williams
T.M.Stenens
Kenny Kirkland
Kenny Davis
Lonnie Plaxico
Lonnie Smith
Vincent Herring
Judy Niemack
Mike Formanek
Kenny Davis
Antonio Hart
Yoshio Suzuki
Tsyoshi Yamamoto
Gary King
Mark Soskin
Tom Harrell
Danny Gotlieb
Al Foster
Rufus Reid
Dick Oatts
Myra Casales

References

External links 
Website
https://www.youtube.com/shinobunyc
Shinobu Ito facebook
You Play Jazz
All About Jazz

Japanese guitarists
Living people
Year of birth missing (living people)
Tokai University alumni
Musicians from Kanagawa Prefecture
Japanese expatriates in the United States